Solomon Nii Otokonor Sampah also known as Solomon Sampah, Pap Solo, Paa Solo, and Quench Walahi  (14 February 1945 - 22 January 2016) was a Ghanaian actor, he was known for the commercial he did for Original Hacks.

Early life 
He was born in James Town, British Accra. He was a singer and dancer with Slim's Traditional Band with the Anansekromian Sounds of the erstwhile National Folkloric Company.

Career 
He was an actor with the National Drama Company formed in the early 1960s, and also with the Abibigromma group where he retired. He played the congas and assorted percussion for the Amartey Hedzoleh Band which recorded the soundtrack for King Ampah's Kukurantumi: Road to Accra film in 1983 and was the Welfare Office for Ghana's Actors Guild (GAG).

Filmography 

 Foul Play
 Queen's Bride
 Owuo Safoa
 Ultimate Paradise
 The Agony of Christ

References 

1945 births
2016 deaths
Ghanaian actors
Ghanaian male actors